Rabson is both a surname and a given name. Notable people with the name include:

Surname 

Alan S. Rabson (1926–2018), American cancer researcher
Arnold B. Rabson, American scientist
Ann Rabson (born 1945), American blues musician and singer
Jan Rabson (1954–2022), American actor and voice actor

Given name 

Rabson Mucheleng'anga (born 1989), Zambian footballer
Rabson Mararo Tembo (Born 1963),American Zambian Clergyman

See also
Rabson–Mendenhall syndrome, insulin receptor disorder